{{Infobox comic book title

| image               = The New 52 Futures End 0.jpg
| imagesize           = 
| caption             = Cover of The New 52: Futures End #0 (May 2014 DC Comics). Art by Ryan Sook.
| schedule            = Weekly
| limited             = Y
| Superhero           = Y
| publisher           = DC Comics
| date                = 
| startmo             = May
| startyr             = 2014
| endmo               = April
| endyr               = 2015
| issues              = 48, plus a 0 issue
| main_char_team      = FrankensteinFirestormMister Terrific (Michael Holt)Batman (Terry McGinnis)Lois Lane
| issn                =
| writers             = Brian Azzarello, Jeff Lemire, Dan Jurgens, Keith Giffen
| artists             = {{Plainlist|
Issue 0: Ethan Van Sciver, et al.
Issues 1, 6, 9, 13, 17, 22, 25, 29, 34, 39, 40, 44: Patrick Zircher
Issues 2, 5, 12, 16, 24, 31, 35: Jesus Merino, Dan Green
Issue 3: Dan Jurgens, Mark Irwin
Issues 4, 7, 10, 14, 20, 23, 27, 37: Aaron Lopresti, Art Thibert
Issues 8, 15, 19, 26, 32: Scot Eaton, Drew Geraci
Issues 11, 18: Georges Jeanty, Dexter Vines
Issue 21: Cully Hamner
Issues 28, 38, 43, 44: Andy MacDonald
Issue 30: Tom Raney
Issue 33: Aaron Lopresti, Scot Eaton, Art Thibert
Issue 36, 41, 42, 46: Scot Eaton, Scott Hanna
Issue 45: Jack Herbert, Stephen Thompson Issue 47: Andy MacDonald, Alberto Ponticelli, Allan GoldmanIssue 48: Andy MacDonald, Allan Goldman, Stephen Thompson, Freddie E. Williams II}}
| pencillers          = 
| inkers              = 
| letterers           = 
| colorists           = 
| editors             = 
| creative_team_month = 
| creative_team_year  = 
| creators            = 
| TPB                 = 
| ISBN                = 
| subcat              = 
| altcat              = 
| sort                = New 52 Futures End
| addpubcat#          = 
| nonUS               = 
}}The New 52: Futures End is an eleven-month weekly comic book miniseries, published by American company DC Comics from May 2014 to April 2015. The series is set five years in The New 52's future, and is written by Brian Azzarello, Keith Giffen, Dan Jurgens, and Jeff Lemire. Covers for the series are drawn by Ryan Sook.

Publication history
In December 2013, DC Comics announced the series would launch in May 2014, with Keith Giffen, Brian Azzarello, Dan Jurgens, and Jeff Lemire writing. The series would start with a #0 issue, released on Free Comic Book Day on May 3, 2014, with issue 1 releasing later in the month. Artists on the series include Ethan Van Sciver, drawing the zero issue, along with Jesus Merino, Aaron Lopresti and Jurgens, as well as others who will be added as the series goes from one issue to the next. Lemire stated the series is "an exploration of DC's past, present and its future," with the writers trying "to explore the nature of what a hero is." It was also revealed that Ryan Sook would provide the covers, as well as character designs, for the series.

In January 2014, the writers revealed the concept for the story began to come together around June 2013. Griffen stated that each writer has a voice in each issue, and the four "have conference calls wherein we explain what we're hoping to do in the next issue, and then we parse out the pages – 'I'll trade you one for two' – and figure out who's doing what, and what order they're in." Jurgens added that each writer will concentrate on certain characters, saying "They'll encounter each from time to time, and then we start to work that wider scope thing, and then pull back and let them have their own adventures for a bit." Later in the month, Newsarama commented on the styling of the title as Futures End opposed to Future's End, speculating that the series may affect multiple futures seen in The New 52 since its launch. DC co-publisher Dan DiDio responded to this by saying, "what you're going to see is the potential of where the futures can be going" as well as the "direct impact it has on stories set in the current timeline in the DCU." In February 2014, with the May 2014 solicitations, it was revealed that the first issue would release on May 7, 2014, four days after the zero issue on Free Comic Book Day.

In April 2014, a teaser image by Mikel Janin, captioned "When Futures End... Blood Moon Shall Rise!", was released via the "Channel 52" back up in all comics. The image, in the style of M. C. Escher's Relativity, highlighted characters of the series, as well as red skies, which Newsarama noted might be a tease to an eventual crisis.

Premise
Starting 35 years into the future of the DC Universe, before moving to five years in the future, Prime Earth is feeling the after effects of a war across the multiverse. As a new threat approaches the vulnerable Earth, Batman Beyond travels back in time to help the heroes of Prime Earth fend off the impending apocalypse.

Characters
With the series announcement, Lemire noted that The New 52: Futures End would mainly focus on Frankenstein, Firestorm and Batman Beyond, who will make his in-continuity debut in the series and was later confirmed by Azzarello to be Terry McGinnis. Lemire added that "The cast is quite large," and the writers will try "to create new characters and new concepts that will hopefully have a life beyond the series."

With the May 2014 solicit preview summaries in February 2014, it was revealed that former WildStorm properties Grifter and Stormwatch would play a role in the series. Their inclusion suggests a larger presence of WildStorm characters, who have generally been limited to solo titles since the start of The New 52. Later in the month, DiDio stated that the creative team were the ones to choose to use WildStorm characters, and stated DC has "a lot of faith in them. That's why they were in the initial launch. And from our standpoint, this gives us another opportunity to show why we included them in the beginning, and why feel that they're part of our pantheon now."

As well, the April 2014 teaser image by Janin showcased previously unknown characters for the series, such as Mister Terrific, Lois Lane, Robin, Hawkman, Apollo, Booster Gold and Amethyst, along with Frankenstein, Firestorm, Batman Beyond and Grifter.

Plot
Thirty-five years into the future, Brother Eye has managed to transform the majority of superheroes into cyborg bugs. As the last remaining heroes launch one final attack on Brother Eye's power source, Bruce Wayne creates a time machine in an attempt to prevent Brother Eye's ascension and this future. Before Bruce is able to use the time machine, he gets ambushed by cyborg bugs, forcing Batman (Terry McGinnis) to travel through time instead. Arriving in the past, Terry realizes that he has arrived five years too late, with what he was trying to prevent already in play. After Terry is attacked by the cyborg bug of Plastique, which he subsequently dismantles, he learns that Mister Terrific is working on the technology which will lead to Brother Eye's ascension. He poses as a homeless person and slums outside Terrifitech Tower.

The DC Universe of five years in the future is one that has been rocked by enormous social upheaval slightly in the future of contemporary DC Comics stories. For example, following the events of Earth 2: Worlds End, thousands of refugees from the alternate universe of Earth 2 arrived on Earth after the destruction of their Earth; many are close doppelgangers of their Prime Earth counterparts. They were closely followed by the hordes of Apokolips, which had ravaged their world, leading to an all-out global conflict in which many civilians and heroes died. After the war, the governments of the world responded with hostility to the new interdimensional refugees, and scientists such as Mister Terrific developed new ways to detect who is from Earth or who is, in fact, an Earth 2 alien. Early in Futures End, further tragedies only add to the division and chaos in the superhero community. After Green Arrow appears to die, the two component parts of the hero Firestorm (Ronnie Raymond and Jason Rusch) have a major falling out over their failure to save him. The crew of the spacefaring team Stormwatch is attacked and destroyed, leaving Frankenstein and the Atom to lead a team determined to recover them.

In another plot thread, Grifter is putting his abilities to good use; he can easily detect who is and isn't native to this Earth. He is eventually recruited by King Faraday to work with Deathstroke on Cadmus Island, where thousands of Earth 2 refugees are being inhumanely held captive. Elsewhere, Lois Lane's arc sees her determined to uncover the circumstances behind Green Arrow's death, but her investigations lead her to discover Tim Drake, the former and thought-deceased Red Robin, alive and masquerading as a bartender named Cal. On Earth, the public question why Superman has become more violent and taken to wearing a full-face mask, until Lois discovers and reveals that Shazam has taken over as Superman in Clark Kent's absence. The real Clark later returns to Earth, as discovered by John Constantine, due to the impending threat of Brainiac's invasion. It is Brainiac who, unknowingly, is manipulating Mister Terrific into creating Brother Eye. He, too, is causing the security issues at Cadmus Island which are causing difficulties for Grifter and Deathstroke.

In the final stretch of the series, Green Arrow is revealed to have faked his death, in collaboration with his Earth 2 doppelganger Red Arrow, has built an army to oppose the internment of Earth 2's refugees. When Brainiac attempts to capture New York City to add to his collection of cities from different eras of history, he is opposed by a united front of Superman, Mister Terrific, the Atom, and a new Firestorm (composed of Jason Rusch and Tim Drake's girlfriend Madison). Using the Atom's shrinking technology, Mister Terrific's T-spheres, and the Brother Eye code, they are able to shrink down and capture a city-sized Brainiac, ending his threat to their reality. However, Brother Eye's technology is still set to bring on a technological apocalypse. Terry McGinnis attempts to shut down Mister Terrific's development of his technology, but accidentally helps it along with the introduction of corrupted technology from his future. In a final battle, he teams up with Tim Drake, who has been persuaded to return to active duty as a hero, and sacrifices himself in order to prevent the rise of the machines. Honouring his sacrifice, Tim Drake takes Terry's futuristic Batman suit and becomes the new Batman.

With Brother Eye having taken over all of the technology on Earth, Tim is forced to use Terry's time travel technology (repaired by the Atom) to travel back in time a further five years and destroy Brother Eye's satellite in the past (the very-near future in contemporaneous DC Comics). He convinces the Brother Eye satellite not to send a beacon in response to the distress call of Earth 2's refugees, leaving them stranded in their own dimension. In the final issue and the story's denouement, Tim Drake emerges in Terry's future, 35 years later, only to find his mission in the past was a failure and humanity remains enslaved and decimated by the machines. Accepting that it is impossible to defeat Brother Eye with time travel, he vows to form a resistance in the present day, setting up the new Batman Beyond spin-off series starring Tim Drake as Batman. The future of Earth's 2 now-stranded refugees, and the ultimate aims of Brainiac, are left open to be picked up on in the Convergence crossover series.

September 2014 event

In February 2014, DC announced that as part of the celebration of The New 52's third anniversary, all ongoing titles published in September 2014 feature stories that tie in to The New 52: Futures End. DiDio stated "One of the things we wanted to do was not just look at it through the lens of the weekly series, but also take a month and flash forward, and see what the potential futures of all our characters might be in that month. So in that month, you'll get a chance to see where, in the next five years, our characters might finish up or might end up being." He added that like the "Villains Month" event in September 2013, these titles also feature 3D lenticular covers, in addition to the 2D ones, saying, "The covers now will also have the ability to have a 'flicker' effect. That means that the images change and show the transformation going on... There is a level of change that is taking place with our characters during the course of this story."

Following the month of tie-ins, a third weekly title will launch in October 2014. This title will be set in the present DC Universe, while showcasing the events and circumstances that lead to the future depicted in Futures End. In April 2014, the title was revealed to be Earth 2: World's End, indicating it would be focused on the Earth 2 universe.

Titles were released as [Title]: Futures End #1. For example, Batman issue released as Batman: Futures End #1.

Reception
In February 2014, The New 52: Futures End, along with DC's first weekly title launching in 2014, Batman Eternal, were featured on IGN's "Most Anticipated Comics of 2014". The first issue received mixed reviews. Richard Gray of Newsarama felt in the first issue, "The deliberately disjointed plot is designed to keep readers discombobulated and asking all the right questions, but mostly, 'why is this the new status quo?' Yet by leading with a group of characters not popular enough to sustain their own titles, The New 52: Futures End is missing the key hook of us being given new information about characters we’ve grown to care about," giving the issue a 6 out of 10. IGN's Jesse Schedeen gave the issue a 7.0 out of 10, saying, "while everything is competently executed so far, the... vague allusions to wars and other dramatic developments in the more immediate future of the New 52, [makes the series read] like a very ambitious What If? comic."

Sales
For May 2014, Diamond Comic Distributors announced that The New 52: Futures End issues 1–4 were the 9th, 19th, 26th and 28th best selling titles of the month, respectively.

In other media
Elements from the storyline were adapted into the final movie of the DC Animated Movie Universe, Justice League Dark: Apokolips War as part of the DC Universe Animated Original Movies

Collected editions

 See also 
 DC One Million - A similar event about a possible future in the DC Universe

References

Monthly Creative Team SolicitationsIssue 0: Issues 1–4: Issues 5–8: Issues 9–13: Issues 14–17: Issues 18–21: Issues 22–26: Issues 27–30: Issues 31–35: Issues 36–39:''' 

Comics by Brian Azzarello
Comics by Dan Jurgens
Comics by Jeff Lemire
Comics by Keith Giffen
DC Comics limited series